Flametree is a coastal locality in the Whitsunday Region, Queensland, Australia.

Geography 

Although mountainous in most parts, Flametree has a narrow relatively flat valley which is used for the Whitsunday Airport (not to be confused with the larger Whitsunday Coast Airport at Proserpine). The locality is presumably named after Flame Tree Creek (formerly Adder Creek) which flows from the south-west of the locality to the north-east of the locality where there is a small sandy north-facing beach on Pioneer Bay.

The north-west of the locality is part of Conway National Park.

Proserpine-Shute Harbour Road passes through the locality connecting from the Bruce Highway near Proserpine through to Shute Harbour.

History 
Flametree comprises part of the former locality of Jubilee.

References

External links 

Whitsunday Region
Coastline of Queensland
Localities in Queensland